Health Physics is a monthly peer-reviewed medical journal published by Lippincott Williams & Wilkins. Its scope includes research into radiation safety and healthcare applications. It is the official journal of the Health Physics Society. It was established in 1958 and it is edited by Brant Ulsh.

Operational Radiation Safety is published as a quarterly supplement to Health Physics.

Abstracting and indexing 
The journal is abstracted and indexed in:
 Chemical Abstracts Service
 Index Medicus/MEDLINE/PubMed
 Science Citation Index
 Current Contents/Agriculture, Biology & Environmental Sciences
 BIOSIS Previews
According to the Journal Citation Reports, the journal has a 2014 impact factor of 1.271.

References

External links 
 

Radiology and medical imaging journals
Lippincott Williams & Wilkins academic journals
English-language journals
Monthly journals
Publications established in 1958